The Tennessee–Vanderbilt football rivalry is an American college football rivalry between the Tennessee Volunteers and Vanderbilt Commodores. They are both founding members of the Southeastern Conference (SEC). Vanderbilt and Tennessee have played 115 times since 1892. Tennessee leads the all-time series 78–33–5.

History

From 1892–1927, Vanderbilt went 19–2–3 against Tennessee. Tennessee's hiring of Robert Neyland in 1926 reversed completely the on field rivalry. Nathan Dougherty hired him with the explicit goal to "even the score with Vanderbilt." Vanderbilt's Dan McGugin (1904–17, 1919–34) was 13–8–3 all-time against the Vols.

Vanderbilt's longest win streak is 9 from 1901 to 1913. Tennessee's longest win streak is 22 from 1983 to 2004.

From 1928 to 2011, Tennessee went 71–9–2 against Vanderbilt. But since 2012, Tennessee leads 6–5.

Game results

Notable games

1892: The rivalry's first two games
1892 saw the first ever matchup between the Vanderbilt Commodores and the Tennessee Volunteers. The two schools played each other twice during the year; Vanderbilt won both games.  On the first matchup; for the Volunteers it was their third ever game in the second season of play and their first season with more than one game. For the Commodores it was their seventh ever game and third season of play.

The first game was played in Nashville on October 21, 1892. The Volunteers only managed one score as the Commodores rolled to a 22–4 victory. The second game was played in Knoxville on November 17. The Vols did not manage a single score as Vanderbilt won 12–0.   The captain of Vanderbilt was Elliott Jones and its quarterback was William E. Beard.

1900: Tie at Vanderbilt jubilee
A game was played between the schools as part of Vanderbilt's celebrations surrounding its 25th anniversary. It ended a scoreless tie.

1902: Edgerton scores
1902 had one of Tennessee's strongest early elevens. Vanderbilt won 12–5 despite a weak line due to its running game. John Edgerton scored both Vanderbilt touchdowns. Tennessee's only score was provided by an A. H. Douglas run around right end, breaking two tackles and getting the touchdown. Nash Buckingham had a 40-yard run through the line. Jones Beene blocked and tackled well.

1908: Vandy wins despite Leach

1908 was a down year for Vanderbilt with a wealth of sophomores; guided shrewdly by McGugin to its success. The Volunteers had compiled four wins in conference play. It was widely considered the best Tennessee football season up to that point. Vanderbilt won the match between the two schools 16–9.

Walker Leach made a 41-yard field goal to put the Vols up 4–0. "This seemed to arouse the local team" and Vanderbilt drove down the field for a touchdown. On a fake kick, Leach circled Vanderbilt's left end for 60 yards. Ray Morrison stopped him short of the goal. Nathan Dougherty was on Tennessee's squad.

1913: Tennessee mistakes help Vanderbilt
Red Rainey scored Tennessee's touchdown. Goat Carroll missed the kick.  Tennessee's right guard S. D. Bayer drew a 33-yard, half the distance to the goal penalty for slugging, and was ejected by umpire Bradley Walker. The first down after, Hord Boensch threw a touchdown pass to Enoch Brown. Brown ran the last ten yards shaking off several defenders. Boensch kicked goal and won the game for Vanderbilt.

1914: UT's first victory
In 1914, Tennessee was undefeated Southern Intercollegiate Athletic Association (SIAA) champions. It was the first championship of any kind for the Tennessee program. The 1914 Vols were retroactively awarded a national championship by 1st-N-Goal, though this remains largely unrecognized. Alonzo "Goat" Carroll scored all of Tennessee's points in the 16–14 victory, Tennessee's first over Vandy.

An account of the first touchdown reads, "Four minutes of play had barely drifted by when Tennessee's weird, mystic, elusive forward pass, May to Carroll, deadly in accuracy, went sailing home for the first touchdown of the game. The chesty Tennessee quarterback sent the oval whizzing for a distance of thirty-five yards and Carroll gathered in the ball near his goal line, when he hurried beneath the posts with all the speed at his command."

1916: UT surprises
Tennessee upset Vanderbilt 10–6 in 1916. Vanderbilt's lone score came on a 70-yard run by Rabbit Curry. The year's only unanimous All-Southern Graham Vowell scored Tennessee's winning touchdown. Tennessee and Georgia Tech finished the season as conference co-champions.

1918: Berryhill scores six times
In 1918, Vanderbilt beat Tennessee by its largest ever margin; 76–0. Grailey Berryhill scored six touchdowns. The Student Army Training Corps represented UT, and so Tennessee does not count the game, however, Vanderbilt does.

1919: A tie in the rain
A steady rain soaked spectators and both squads. The contest ended tied at three. Josh Cody scored on a 30-yard drop kick, while Buck Hatcher made a 25-yard drop kick.

1920: Vanderbilt avenges '16 on Waite Field
In what was expected to be a hard match, the Commodores got vengeance for Curry, who died in aerial combat over France during the First World War, and lost to Tennessee on Waite Field in 1916, by netting a 20 to 0 victory at the Vols' home field.  All three of Vandy's touchdowns were owed to passes from Jess Neely to Gink Hendrick.

1921: Kuhn acts as captain

The Vanderbilt Commodores went undefeated in 1921. Vanderbilt played the Tennessee Volunteers  on a soggy Old Dudley Field, winning by a score of 14 to 0.  Team captain Pink Wade did not play due to a case of lumbago.  Acting as the captain in his absence, Doc Kuhn scored all of Vanderbilt's touchdowns. Fatty Lawrence also did not play in the game. Tennessee was excited for the game, preparing for weeks with new plays and persistent drilling.  It was said Vanderbilt was "the one team that Tennessee enjoys defeating."

During the first quarter, an end run of about 20 yards from Kuhn first made the score 7–0.  In the second, after the Commodores obtained good field position from the punt returns of Rupert Smith, Kuhn had a 30 or 35-yard touchdown run utilizing Lynn Bomar as a lead blocker.

At one point in the second half, Freddie "Froggie" Meiers carried an onside kick over for a touchdown, but it was called back. The Tennessee backs were repeatedly thrown for no gain or losses all game, and steady improvement from the Commodore eleven had been noticed.

1922: Vanderbilt triumphs at Shields–Watkins Field
The Vanderbilt Commodores were undefeated conference champions in the first year of the Southern Conference. The Commodores beat Tennessee at Knoxville by a score of 14 to 6.  The eighteenth meeting between Vanderbilt and Tennessee saw a packed stadium, the largest crowd of the season for Shields–Watkins Field. It was Vanderbilt's first game at the new stadium, which opened September 24, 1921.

Tennessee was out for revenge, as they had only beaten the Commodores twice, and Vanderbilt was ahead in points scored in the series by a vast margin, 347 to 53. Tennessee also hoped to better its Southern Conference record after having lost to Georgia.  Both teams had last week rested their starters, Vanderbilt winning over Mercer, and Tennessee beating Mississippi by a score of 49 to 0. It was therefore thought the game should be a closer one than in years past, with Vanderbilt only slight favorites.  The game turned out to be hotly contested, so much so that many felt Vanderbilt was outplayed but not outfought.  Perhaps the week off for many Commodore starters had hindered Vanderbilt's ability to play its best.

Tennessee drove down to the 7-yard line in the first quarter, but was held on downs. The first score came from Vanderbilt in the second quarter on a 31-yard touchdown pass from Jess Neely to Doc Kuhn.  Wakefield kicked goal.

In the fourth quarter, Tennessee got to the 1-yard line after a series of long passes.  Tennessee fullback Roe Campbell charged over the line for the touchdown.  The Volunteers' Clayton failed to kick goal.  Later in the fourth, Vanderbilt intercepted a Tennessee pass in Volunteer territory, leading to a chance to score.  After runs at the line failed, a 5-yard pass from Neely to Lynn Bomar got the touchdown.  Hek Wakefield's try was successful.

Lynn Bomar, Scotty Neill, Gil Reese, and Fatty Lawrence were mentioned as the players of the game for the Commodores, and Campbell was cited as the star for the Volunteers. It was said Neill out-punted the Volunteers on nearly every occasion. The Nashville Banner said Lawrence had been "in there doing a man's job blocking a kick and tackling with the deadliness of a tiger unleashed in a cave of lions."

1923: Vanderbilt unleashes pent up fury

After two undefeated seasons and a scoreless tie with Michigan, hopes were high going into the 1923 season. Michigan this year were national champions and edged out the Commodores 3–0. Vanderbilt then was upset by Texas. The week before the Tennessee game, Vanderbilt suffered a scoreless tie with Mississippi A&M in the rain. With a 51–7 victory over the Tennessee Volunteers the next week, the Commodores regained "all the power and smoothness with which it had started the 1923 season." Ralph McGill reflected the sentiment, "All the pent-up fury of misunderstanding and disappointment burst out like a flood. The Vols might as well have flung themselves in the way of a runaway train. It was a machine that found itself. The power was there and the Commodores took a fierce joy in using it." The Volunteers were led by M. B. Banks, in his third year as head coach.

Vanderbilt gained 455 yards of total offense. Gil Reese rushed for 214 yards, as well as 95 yards on punt returns.  Reese scored five times, with touchdown runs of 70 yards, 45 yards, and 29 yards respectively. Red Rountree scored another, a 63-yard run.  Captain Doc Kuhn got the other touchdown, and Wakefield made a drop kick.  Lynn Bomar, Alf Sharpe, and Bob Rives on defense helped hold the Volunteers to only 7. With the win Vanderbilt was still a contender for the Southern title. J. G. Lowe played best for Tennessee, getting its lone touchdown.

1927: Dodson gets Neyland a tie

In 1927, two hall of fame coaches without a conference loss battle to a tie. Robert Neyland was hired to coach Tennessee in 1926 by Nathan Dougherty with the explicit goal to "even the score with Vanderbilt." 1927 is his first great team, tying with others as victors of the Southern Conference. Dan McGugin's Commodores led 7–0 until a late Dick Dodson run tied the score. "After the game McGugin questioned each of his players as to his whereabouts during the run. Without exception the players claimed that two men had blocked them. McGugin shrugged. "Well, we'll just protest the play. It's perfectly obvious that Tennessee had twenty-two men on the field."

1928: Vols pass to victory
Tennessee remained undefeated on the season with a 6–0 victory over Vanderbilt; its first win in the series since 1916.  Before 1928, Vanderbilt held a strong advantage over the Volunteers with a record of 18–2–3.  Since 1928, Tennessee has dominated the rivalry.

The crowd of 22,000 was the largest ever to see a game in Tennessee up to that point. A 16-yard pass from Roy Witt to Paul Hug in the second quarter was the lone score of the contest. Jimmy Armistead ran all over Tennessee, once stopped short of the goal by Witt. Buddy Hackman provided strong defense against the forward pass.

1932: A scoreless tie
Clyde Roberts outrushed Beattie Feathers as the SoCon champion Vols tied the Commodores 0–0. The game's lone scoring play was a catch by Feathers, called out of bounds in front of the Vanderbilt bench.

2005: Cutler ends Vols' longest win streak
The Commodores ended their season, and Jay Cutler's Vanderbilt career, at Tennessee against the Tennessee Volunteers with a 28–24 win. The victory was Vanderbilt's first over the Volunteers since 1982, the year before Cutler was born. The win also marked Vanderbilt's first victory over Tennessee on the Volunteers' home field in Knoxville since 1975. Cutler passed for three touchdowns and 315 yards during the game, becoming the first quarterback in school history to record four consecutive 300-yard passing performances. Cutler's final play in college was the game-winning (and streak-ending) touchdown pass to teammate Earl Bennett against Tennessee.

2015: Tennessee finishes with best record since '07
In the 110th meeting between Vanderbilt and Volunteers, Tennessee, who had some heartbreaking losses and blew leads in big games, ended the season on a high note, finishing with their best record since 2007, when they went 10–4. The Volunteers defeated instate rival, 53–28. The Volunteers had 523 total yards, but they also surrendered 411 yards to Vanderbilt. It was the 2nd straight win for Tennessee over Vanderbilt, extending their lead in the series 75–30–5.

2016: Commodores spoil Volunteer Sugar Bowl hopes
Just one year later, the Vols would fall to a 6–6 Vanderbilt team 45–34. Vanderbilt outscored Tennessee 21–3 in the second half to spoil the Sugar Bowl hopes of the Vols. The 45 points scored for the Commodores was their most against Tennessee since the 1923 meeting. Ralph Webb would overtake Zac Stacy's career rushing record and Kyle Shurmur would go on to throw for 416 yards. Josh Dobbs would go 31–34 for 340 yards with 2 TDs, but a late 3rd quarter fumble shifted momentum in the Commodores' favor. Derek Barnett tied Reggie White for the Volunteer career sack record, which stands at 32.

2017: Worst SEC game in 50 years?
The 2017 edition pitted two 4–7 teams, each seeking their first conference win in the finale. One commentator suggested that "statistically speaking" the game might be "the worst Southeastern Conference matchup of the last 50 years," based on an analysis of each team's margin of victory in SEC play to that point. Vanderbilt broke the game open with three fourth-quarter touchdowns to prevail, 42–24.

2019: Volunteers end three-game losing streak to Vanderbilt
Tennessee ended a three-game losing streak to Vanderbilt 28–10 on a stormy evening in Knoxville.  True freshman running back Eric Gray rushed for 246 yards on 25 carries and had three rushing touchdowns.  Gray had the fifth-highest single-game rushing total ever by a Tennessee player.  Tennessee finished the regular season 7–5 and 5–3 in conference play.  The win sealed the Volunteers first winning record in conference play since the 2015 season.

See also
 List of NCAA college football rivalry games
 List of most-played college football series in NCAA Division I

References

College football rivalries in the United States
Tennessee Volunteers football
Vanderbilt Commodores football
1892 establishments in Tennessee